Tom Buckingham (February 25, 1895 – September 7, 1934) was an American film director and screenwriter.  He directed 48 films between 1920 and 1932. He was born in Chicago, Illinois, and died from surgical complications. His film Cock of the Air was restored by the Academy Film Archive in 2016.

Partial filmography
 The Atom (1918)
 Laughing Gas (1920) (director and screenwriter)
 Golf (1922) (director and screenwriter)
 The Agent (1922) (director and screenwriter)
 Arizona Express (1924) (director)
 The Cyclone Rider (1924) (director)
 Troubles of a Bride (1924) (director)
 Forbidden Cargo (1925) (director)
 Ladies of Leisure (1926) (director)
 Lure of the Night Club (1927) (director)
 Crashing Through (1928)
 Hell's Island (1930)
 Officer O'Brien (1930)
 Cock of the Air (1932) (director)
 The Secret Bride (1934) (screenwriter)
 Stage Struck (1936)

References

External links

1895 births
1934 deaths
American film directors
American male screenwriters
20th-century American male writers
20th-century American screenwriters